The Legalize Marijuana Party is a political third party in the U.S. state of New Jersey established in 1998 by Edward Forchion to protest cannabis prohibition.

Gubernatorial candidates
Forchion was nominated by petition to run for Governor of New Jersey in 2005. He received 9,137 votes. While Forchion was campaigning for Governor, his home in Pemberton Township was vandalized, August 25, during the night by someone who spray-painted a 6-foot cross together with the words “Get Jesus.” Burlington County police investigated the incident, calling it a hate crime because Forchion is a person of color. But Forchion told reporters that he thought he had been targeted because of his Rastafari religious beliefs, not because he is African American.

Results in gubernatorial elections

New Jersey election results

Results in county elections
Forchion ran for Camden County Freeholder in 1999, and Burlington County Freeholder in 2000. In a bid for Burlington County Freeholder in 2004, Forchion got 2,932 votes.

Results in New Jersey state elections

Results in federal elections

History

In 2014, Forchion, otherwise known as NJ Weedman, filed a lawsuit in an attempt to get onto the ballot in New Jersey's 3rd congressional district. A judge dismissed the lawsuit.

See also
 Cannabis political parties of the United States

References

1998 establishments in New Jersey
1998 in cannabis
Cannabis political parties of the United States
Political parties established in 1998
Political parties in New Jersey